Avgury is a rural locality (a selo) in Novofedorovskoye Rural Settlement of Staroshaygovsky District, Mordovia, Russia. The population was 63 as of 2010. There is 1 street.

Geography 
Avgury is located 25 km north of Staroye Shaygovo (the district's administrative centre) by road. Vertelim is the nearest rural locality.

References 

Rural localities in Mordovia
Staroshaygovsky District